Matthew MacKenzie "Mack" Robinson (July 18, 1914 – March 12, 2000) was an American track and field athlete. He is best known for winning a silver medal in the 1936 Summer Olympics, where he broke the Olympic record in the 200 meters. He was the older brother of Baseball Hall of Fame member Jackie Robinson.

Early life
Mack was born in Cairo, Georgia, in 1914. He and his siblings were left fatherless at an early age, leaving their mother, Mallie Robinson, as the sole support of the children. She performed in a variety of manual labor tasks, and moved with her children to Pasadena, California, while the children were still young. At the start of middle school Mack was diagnosed with a heart murmur that got worse with age, and was advised to only play non-contact sports. He remained in town for school, and set national junior college records in the 100 meter, 200 meter, and long jump at Pasadena Junior College.

1936 Olympics
He placed second in the 200 meters at the United States Olympic Trials in 1936, earning himself a place on the Olympic team. He went on to win the silver medal at the Summer Olympics in Berlin, finishing 0.4 seconds behind Jesse Owens. In 2016, the 1936 Olympic journey of the eighteen Black American athletes, including Robinson, was documented in the film Olympic Pride, American Prejudice.

Later career and life
Mack Robinson attended the University of Oregon, graduating in 1941. With Oregon he won numerous titles in NCAA, AAU and Pacific Coast Conference track meets. He has been honored as being one of the most distinguished graduates of the University of Oregon and is a member of the University of Oregon Hall of Fame and the Oregon Sports Hall of Fame.

For a time in the early 1970s, Mack was a park director of Lemon Grove Park, a park in the East Hollywood part of the City of Los Angeles.

Later in life, he was known for leading the fight against street crime in his home town of Pasadena. The Pasadena Robinson Memorial, dedicated to both Matthew and Jackie, was dedicated in 1997. The memorial statue of Jackie Robinson by sculptor Richard H. Ellis at UCLA Bruins baseball team's home Jackie Robinson Stadium, was installed by the efforts of Jackie's brother, Mack.

Several locations are named in honor of Matthew Robinson. In addition to the Pasadena Robinson Memorial, the stadium of Pasadena City College was dedicated to him in 2000. That same year, the United States Postal Service approved naming the new post office in Pasadena the Matthew 'Mack' Robinson Post Office Building.

Robinson died of complications from diabetes, kidney failure, and pneumonia, on March 12, 2000, at a hospital in Pasadena, California; he was 85. He is interred at Mountain View Cemetery and Mausoleum, Altadena, California.

Notes

References
Matthew Robinson entry at infoplease.com
Congressman Adam Schiff speech in honor of Matthew Robinson
article "Jackie Robinson Remembered" at finarticles.com
Rampersad, Arnold. Jackie Robinson, a Biography. New York: Alfred A. Knopf, 1997.
https://web.archive.org/web/20090206050141/http://www.goducks.com/ViewArticle.dbml?DB_OEM_ID=500&ATCLID=246730

External links

 

1914 births
2000 deaths
African-American male track and field athletes
American male sprinters
Athletes (track and field) at the 1936 Summer Olympics
Deaths from diabetes
Deaths from pneumonia in California
Deaths from kidney failure
Jackie Robinson
Junior college men's track and field athletes in the United States
Medalists at the 1936 Summer Olympics
Olympic silver medalists for the United States in track and field
Oregon Ducks men's track and field athletes
People from Cairo, Georgia
Sportspeople from Pasadena, California
Track and field athletes from California
Track and field athletes from Georgia (U.S. state)
African-American history in Eugene, Oregon
African-American history of Oregon